Seda is a rural locality (a selo) in Kishertskoye Rural Settlement, Kishertsky District, Perm Krai, Russia. The population was 211 as of 2010.

Geography 
Seda is located 5 km south of Ust-Kishert (the district's administrative centre) by road. Nizkoye is the nearest rural locality.

References 

Rural localities in Kishertsky District